The National Defense Management Center, also known as the National Defense Control Center (NDCC) НЦУО, formerly the Central Command Post of the General Staff of the Russian Armed Forces is the supreme command and control center of the Russian Ministry of Defense and the Russian Armed Forces.

Function

The center is considered as the second highest authority responsible for the Defense Ministry's management and supervision, after the Minister himself and is directly subordinate to the General Staff of the Armed Forces of the Russian Federation, overseen by the Chief of the General Staff.

It has a powerful military supercomputer called NDMC Supercomputer with a speed of 16 petaflops and storage capacity of 236 petabytes.

The center is located in the Main Building of the Ministry of Defense at Znamenka 19, Moscow, Russia.

The computer network of the center is based on the Russian military computer operating system Astra Linux by Rusbitech company, which in 2018 was declared the future ultimate standard for the Army. Modernization with artificial intelligence software is underway.

Chief of the National Defense Management Center
Since its establishment in late 2014, Lieutenant General Mikhail Mizintsev was appointed as the defense center's first director. He was promoted to Colonel General in 2017.

In September 2022, Oleg Gorshenin, former commander of the 154th separate commandant's regiment, was appointed Head of the National Defense Management Center, replacing Mizintsev who was appointed to Deputy Defence Minister.

Gallery

See also
 National Military Command Center (United States)
 Military citadels under London (United Kingdom)

References

External links
 Official Homepage

Military command and control installations
2014 establishments in Russia
Ministry of Defence (Russia)